The Li Tien-lu Hand Puppet Historical Museum is a museum in Sanzhi District, New Taipei, Taiwan.

History
The museum opened on 31 December 1996, two years before the death of its namesake, the puppeteer Li Tien-lu. The museum was reopened on 1 January 2005 after renovation works.

Exhibitions
The museum houses more than 200 antique puppet heads of more than 100 years old as well as cultural relics. The Almost Life Like Puppet Theater also perform regularly in the museum. Within its collections are items used by Li during his career.

See also
 List of museums in Taiwan

References

1996 establishments in Taiwan
Museums established in 1996
Museums in New Taipei
Puppet museums in Taiwan